A basidium is a microscopic sporangium (a spore-producing structure) found on the hymenophore of fruiting bodies of basidiomycete fungi which are also called tertiary mycelium, developed from secondary mycelium. Tertiary mycelium is highly-coiled secondary myceliuma dikaryon. The presence of basidia is one of the main characteristic features of the Basidiomycota. A basidium usually bears four sexual spores called basidiospores; occasionally the number may be two or even eight. In a typical basidium, each basidiospore is borne at the tip of a narrow prong or horn called a sterigma, and is forcibly discharged upon maturity.

The word basidium literally means "little pedestal", from the way in which the basidium supports the spores. However, some biologists suggest that the structure more closely resembles a club. An immature basidium is known as a basidiole.

Structure
Most basidiomycota have single celled basidia (holobasidia), but in some groups basidia can be multicellular (a phragmobasidia). For instance, rust fungi in the order Puccinales have four-celled phragmobasidia that are transversely septate; some jelly fungi in the order Tremellales have four-celled phragmobasidia that are cruciately septate. Sometimes the basidium (metabasidium) develops from a probasidium, which is a specialized cell which is not elongated like a typical hypha. The basidium may be stalked or sessile.

The basidium typically has the shape of a club: Narrow at the stem and wide near its outer end. It is widest at the waist of the hemispherical dome at its apex, and its base is about half the size of the widest apical diameter. Versions where the basidium is shorter and narrower at the base are called "obovoid", and occur in genera such as Paullicorticium, Oliveonia, and Tulasnella. Basidia with a wide base are often described as "barrel-shaped".

Mechanism of basidiospore discharge
In most basidiomycota, the basidiospores are ballistospores — they are forcibly discharged. The propulsive force is derived from a sudden change in the center of gravity of the discharged spore. Important factors in forcible discharge include Buller's drop, a droplet of fluid that can be observed to accumulate at the proximal tip (hilar appendage) of each basidiospore; the offset attachment of the spore to the subtending sterigma, and the presence of hygroscopic regions on the basidiospore surface.
Basidiospore discharge can only succeed after sufficient water vapor has condensed on the spore.

Upon maturity of a basidiospore, sugars present in the cell wall begin to serve as condensation loci for water vapor in the air. Two separate regions of condensation are critical. At the pointed tip of the spore (the hilum) closest to the supporting basidium, Buller's drop accumulates as a large, almost spherical water droplet.

At the same time, condensation occurs in thin film on the adaxial face of the spore. When these two bodies of water coalesce, the release of surface tension and the sudden change in the center of mass leads to sudden discharge of the basidiospore. Remarkably, the initial acceleration of the spore is estimated to be about 10,000 .

Evolutionary loss of forcible discharge
Some basidiomycetes do not have a means to forcibly expel their basidiospores, although they still form them. In each of these groups, spore dispersal occurs through other discharge mechanisms.

For example:
 Members of the order Phallales (stinkhorns) rely on insect vectors for dispersal.
 The dry spores of the Lycoperdales (puffballs) and Sclerodermataceae (earth balls and kin) are dispersed when the basidiocarps are disturbed.
 Species of the Nidulariales (bird's nest fungi) use a splash cup mechanism.

In these cases the basidiospore typically lacks a hilar appendage, and no forcible discharge occurs. Each example is thought to represent an independent evolutionary loss of the forcible discharge mechanism ancestral to all basidiomycetes.

References

External links
 AmericanMushrooms.com: How do fungi reproduce?
 APSnet Illustrated Glossary of Plant Pathology: Basidum
 Demonstrating basidiospore discharge by John Webster. Mycological Society of America Lab Manual
 IMA Mycological Glossary: Basidum
 Spore discharge and dispersal in mushrooms by Heino Lepp, Australian National Botanic Gardens.
 "Using a Microscope: Basidia and Cystidia" by Michael Kuo, MushroomExpert.com

Basidiomycota
Fungal morphology and anatomy